Chhota Chhindwara, also known as Gotegaon, is a town in Nagar Palika in Narsinghpur district, Madhya Pradesh, India. It is served by  railway station.

References

Cities and towns in Narsinghpur district
Narsinghpur